Republicans, Get in My Vagina is a 2012 American short film starring Andrea Savage, Judy Greer and Kate Beckinsale.  It was written and directed by Andrea Savage.

Cast
Andrea Savage as Woman # 1 
Judy Greer as Woman # 2 
Kate Beckinsale as Woman # 3

References

External links
 

A satire of the Republican Party's policies concerning abortion and prenatal care

2012 films
2012 short films
American short films
2010s English-language films